Sehore District is a district of Madhya Pradesh state in central India. The town of Sehore is the district headquarters. The district is part of Bhopal Division.

Demographics 

According to the 2011 census, Sehore District has a population of 1,311,332. This gives it a ranking of 373 in India (out of a total of 640). Its population growth rate over the decade 2001-2011 was 21.51%. Sehore has a sex ratio of 918 females for every 1,000 males and a literacy rate of 71.11%. 18.95% of the population lives in urban areas. Scheduled Castes and Scheduled Tribes make up 20.69% and 11.10% of the population respectively.

According to the 2011 Census of India, 95.38% of the population in the district spoke Hindi, 2.31% Urdu and 1.46% Malvi as their first language.

References

External links
Sehore District web site
 

 
Districts of Madhya Pradesh